Sayapullo District is one of four districts of the province Gran Chimú  located in the Department of La Libertad, part of the region La Libertad, Peru .

References